Valentin Furdui (born 1 September 1987) is a Moldovan footballer who plays for Spartanii Selemet as a midfielder.

Career
Furdui had his FC Sheriff Tiraspol contract cancelled by mutual consent on 18 June 2014. Going on to sign for Kazakhstan Premier League side FC Kaisar in early July of the same year.

References 

1987 births
Living people
Moldovan footballers
Moldovan expatriate footballers
Association football midfielders
Kazakhstan Premier League players
FC Rapid Ghidighici players
FC Sfîntul Gheorghe players
FC Zimbru Chișinău players
FC Milsami Orhei players
FC Sheriff Tiraspol players
FC Kaisar players
Moldovan Super Liga players
Expatriate footballers in Kazakhstan